Crossfade may refer to:

 Crossfade (audio engineering), an audio mixing technique
 Crossfade (band), a post-grunge/hard rock band from South Carolina
 Crossfade (album), their 2004 debut album
 Crossfade (Swedish band), a Swedish rock-pop band
 Crossfade (The Remix Album) a 2006 album by Arash

See also
 Dissolve (filmmaking), a gradual transition from one image to another